Pedro Gonzalez Gonzalez (May 24, 1925 – February 6, 2006) was an American character actor best known for his appearances in a number of John Wayne movies.

Life and career 
His father was a trumpet player, and his mother was a dancer. His brother was actor Jose Gonzales-Gonzales (1922-2000). He left school at the age of seven to join a family act called "Las Perlitas" that toured southwest Texas. As a result, he was functionally illiterate for all of his life. As a result of his illiteracy, he memorized scripts by having his wife read them to him. Gonzalez Gonzalez married at the age of seventeen and served in the Army during World War II as a driver in the United States. After the war he performed stand-up comedy for Spanish-speaking audiences.

In 1953, he appeared on the Groucho Marx NBC television quiz show You Bet Your Life under the name Ramiro G. Gonzalez, where his banter with Marx attracted notice. Marx asked him: "What does the 'G' stand for?" to which he replied "Gonzalez", and explained that both his parents had been surnamed "Gonzalez" before being married. So Marx asked: "What does your wife call you: Ramiro or Gonzalez?" He replied "She calls me 'Pedro'", triggering rare laughter from Marx. After Gonzalez performed a 15-second comic dance to strong applause, Marx complimented his guest's comedic skill, saying: "Pedro, we could do a great act together. We could make a fortune in vaudeville, you and I. What -- what would we call our act, you know, if we went out together? 'The Two Hot Tamales'?" After Pedro deadpanned "Gonzalez Gonzalez and Marx", Marx made an aside: "That's nice billing. Two people in the act, and I get third place!" 

John Wayne saw his appearance on the program and cast him as comic relief in a number of movies including The High and the Mighty, Rio Bravo and Hellfighters. He also made guest appearances in shows such as The Adventures of Ozzie & Harriet, Gunsmoke and Wanted: Dead or Alive, as well as the Jerry Lewis film, Hook, Line & Sinker. Wayne also had Burt Kennedy write a TV series for Gonzalez Gonzalez that was never made.

Gonzalez Gonzalez played extra characters behind Mel Blanc in a number of Speedy Gonzales cartoons, including "A Taste of Catnip" and "Go Go Amigo," billed generally as Gonzalez Gonzalez.

As a result of playing comic relief roles, he was accused of perpetuating negative stereotypes about Hispanic men. However, Edward James Olmos said of Gonzalez Gonzalez at the time of his death that he "inspired every Latino actor."

He died at his home of natural causes, and was survived by his wife Leandra and three children.

He is the grandfather of actor Clifton Collins Jr.

Filmography

Film

Wings of the Hawk (1953) - Tomas
The High and the Mighty (1954) - Gonzales
Ring of Fear (1954) - Pedro Gonzales
Ricochet Romance (1954) - Manuel Gonzales
Strange Lady in Town (1955) - Trooper Martinez-Martinez
Bengazi (1955) - Kamal
I Died a Thousand Times (1955) - Chico
The Bottom of the Bottle (1956) - Luis Romero
Gun the Man Down (1956) - Hotel man
Man in the Vault (1956) - Pedro
The Sheepman (1958) - Angelo
Rio Bravo (1959) - Carlos Robante
The Young Land (1959) - Deputy Santiago
Chili Corn Corny (1965, Short) - Crows (voice) (as Gonzales Gonzales)
Go Go Amigo (1965, Short) - Mouse (voice) (as Gonzales Gonzales)
Daffy Rents (1966, Short) - Dr. Ben Crazy (voice) (as Gonzales Gonzales)
A Taste of Catnip (1966, Short) - Dr. Mañuel Jose 'Olvera Sebastian Rudolfo Ortiz Pancho Jiminez Perez III (voice) (as Gonzales Gonzales)
The Adventures of Bullwhip Griffin (1967) - Bandido
Hostile Guns (1967) - Angel Dominguez
Hellfighters (1968) - Hernando (uncredited)
The Love Bug (1968) - Mexican Driver
Hook, Line & Sinker (1969) - Perfecto
The Love God? (1969) - Jose - Jungle Guide (uncredited)
Chisum (1970) - Mexican Rancher
Zachariah (1971) - Pancho the Doorman (uncredited)
Support Your Local Gunfighter (1971) - Ortiz
Sixpack Annie (1975) - Carmello
Won Ton Ton, the Dog Who Saved Hollywood (1976) - Mexican Protectionist
Charge of the Model T's (1977) - Sanchez
Dreamer (1979) - Too
There Goes the Bride (1980) - Mr. Ramirez
Flush (1982) - Miguelito
Lust in the Dust (1985) - Mexican, Hardcase Gang
Uphill All the Way (1986) - Chicken Carlos
Y... se hizo justicia (1986)
Ghost Writer (1989) - Mr. Carillo
Down the Drain (1990) - Amigo Rodriguez
Ruby Cairo (1992) - Uncle Jorge
The Wonderful Ice Cream Suit (1998) - Landlord (final film role)
On the Set - Video Documentary Short for The High and the Mighty (2005)

Television

 Telephone Time - episode "Felix the Fourth" - Félix de la Caridad Carvajal y Soto (1956)
The Sheriff of Cochise - episode "The Great Train Robbery" - Manuel Pollo (1956)
The Adventures of Jim Bowie - episode "Ursula" - Manuel (1958)
The Texan - "Stampede" - Pedro Vasquez - (1959)
The Texan - "Showdown at Abilene" - Pedro Vasquez - (1959)
The Texan - "The Reluctant Bridegroom" - Pedro Vasquez - (1959)
The Texan - "Trouble on the Trail" - Pedro Vasquez - (1959)
Bonanza - episode "El Toro Grande" (1960)
Cheyenne - episode "Counterfeit Gun" - Hotel Clerk (uncredited) (1960)
Wanted: Dead or Alive - episode "Triple Vise" - Tomas (1960)
The Texan - "Lady Tenderfoot" - Pedro Martinez - (1960)
Wanted: Dead or Alive - episode "Baa-Baa" - Pedro Hernandaz (1961)
Wide Country - episode "Farewell to Margarita" - The Bus Driver (1963)
Gunsmoke - episode "The Quest for Asa Jahn" - Bartender (1963)
Perry Mason - episode "The Case of the Wednesday Woman" - 'Royce' Dell (1964)
Laredo - episode "The Treasure of San Diablo" - Gonzales (1966)
I Spy - episode "The Conquest of Maude Murdock" - Jaime (1966)
Rango - episode "In a Little Mexican Town" - Drunk (1967)
I Dream of Jeannie - episode "My Turned-On Master" - Pedro (1967)
Hondo - episode "Hondo and the Death Drive" - Sancho (1967)
The Monkees - episode "A Nice Place to Visit" - Lupe (1967)
Laredo - episode "Scourge of San Rosa" - Liveryman (1967)
Mayberry R.F.D. - episode "Sister Cities" - Santos (1969)
I Dream of Jeannie - episode "See You in C-U-B-A" - Jose (1969)
The MOD Squad - episode "Never Give the Fuzz an Even Break" - restaurant Owner (1969)
The Bill Cosby Show - episode "The Sesame Street Rumble" - Bob (1971)
Adam-12 - episode "Anniversary" - Rudolf Diaz (1971)

References

External links

Hollywood.com "Pedro Gonzalez Gonzalez dies" 16 February 2006, retrieved 17 February 2006

American male film actors
American male television actors
Male Western (genre) film actors
United States Army personnel of World War II
Male actors from Texas
1925 births
2006 deaths
American male actors of Mexican descent
American people of Spanish descent
People from Webb County, Texas
Hispanic and Latino American male actors
20th-century American male actors
United States Army soldiers